The Hatia–SMVT Bengaluru Weekly Express is an express train belonging to South Eastern Railway zone that runs between  and Sir M. Visvesvaraya Terminal in India. It is currently being operated with 18637/18638 train numbers on a weekly basis.

Service

The 18637/Hatia–SMVT Bengaluru Express has an average speed of 55 km/h and covers 1890 km in 34h 15m. The 18638/SMVT Bengaluru–Hatia Express has an average speed of 51 km/h and covers 1890 km in 36h 45m.

Route and halts 

The important halts of the train are:

Coach composition

The train has standard LHB rakes with max speed of 160 km/h. The train consists of 16 coaches:

 1 AC II Tier
 4 AC III Tier
 6 Sleeper coaches
 3 General Unreserved
 2 End-on Generator

Traction

Both trains are hauled by an Erode Loco Shed-based WAP-4 electric locomotive from Bangalore Cantonment to Visakhapatnam. From Visakhapatnam, trains are hauled by a Bokaro Steel City Loco Shed-based WDM-3A diesel locomotive up til Hatia.

Direction reversal

The train reverses its direction 1 times:

See also 

 Bangalore Cantonment railway station
 Hatia railway station

Notes

References

External links 

 18637/Hatia - Bengaluru Cantt. Express India Rail Info
 18638/Bengaluru Cantt. - Hatia Express India Rail Info

Transport in Ranchi
Transport in Bangalore
Express trains in India
Rail transport in Jharkhand
Rail transport in Odisha
Rail transport in Andhra Pradesh
Rail transport in Tamil Nadu
Rail transport in Karnataka
Railway services introduced in 2014